William Cicero Hill (August 2, 1874 — January 28, 1938) was an American Major League Baseball pitcher whose career in the National League lasted from 1896 to 1899.

Born in Chattanooga, Tennessee, Hill died in Cincinnati at the age of 63 and was interred at Evergreen Cemetery in the Cincinnati suburb of Southgate, Kentucky.  His younger brother, Hugh Hill, was a Major League outfielder who played during the 1903 and 1904 seasons.

External links

1874 births
1938 deaths
Major League Baseball pitchers
Baseball players from Tennessee
Louisville Colonels players
Baltimore Orioles (NL) players
Brooklyn Superbas players
Cleveland Spiders players
Cincinnati Reds players
19th-century baseball players
Minor league baseball managers
Chattanooga Chatts players
Hartford Indians players
Wooden Nutmegs players
Detroit Tigers (Western League) players
Sportspeople from Chattanooga, Tennessee